Glenora can refer to:

Places
 Glenora, British Columbia, also Fort Glenora, an unincorporated settlement in British Columbia, Canada
 Glenora, Ontario, a community in Ontario, Canada
 Glenora, Edmonton, a neighborhood in Edmonton, Canada
 North Glenora, Edmonton, a neighborhood in Edmonton, Canada
 Glenora, New York, a hamlet in the town of Starkey, Yates County, New York, United States

Other
 Edmonton-Glenora, a provincial electoral district for the Legislative Assembly of Alberta, Canada
 Glenora Distillers, a distiller based in Glenville, Nova Scotia, Canada
 Glenora (ship), a vehicle ferry on Lake Ontario